XING is a Hamburg-based career-oriented social networking site, operated by New Work SE (until mid-2019 XING SE).

The site is primarily focused on the German-speaking market, alongside XING Spain, and competes with the American platform LinkedIn.

Company history 
OPEN Business Club AG was founded in August 2003 in Hamburg, Germany by Lars Hinrichs. Its official debut was 1 November 2003. It was renamed XING in November 2006.

In its early years, the site pursued a global strategy; however, since 2012, XING has focused on the German-speaking market, as 76% of all XING page views come from Germany and 90% come from the D-A-CH area.

Leadership 
Lars Hinrich led the company as CEO until 2009, when he was succeeded by Stefan Groß-Selbeck. Thomas Vollmoeller has served from 2012 and was succeeded by Petra von Strombeck in 2020.

Number of users 
As of April 2019, XING reported 16 million members, up from 10 million members in the D-A-CH area in March 2016, which at that time included 880,000 premium members.

Ownership and acquisitions 
In November 2009, Hubert Burda Media acquired 25.1% of XING, becoming its main shareholder. In 2010, XING acquired online event management company Amiando, changing its name to XING EVENTS. In 2012, Burda increased its shareholding to over 50%. In 2013, XING acquired Austrian e-recruiting company Kununu. In 2015, XING announced a cooperation project with eyeson, a unified communications provider. In 2017, XING acquired global expat network InterNations and Austrian recruitment company Prescreen. In April 2019, XING paid €22 million for Honeypot, a Berlin-based IT job platform.

IPO 
XING became the first Web 2.0 company to go public in Europe, debuting on 7 December 2006 at an issue price of 30 Euros per share.

Website 
The platform offers personal profiles, groups, discussion forums, event coordination, and other common social community features. Basic membership is free, but many core functions, like searching for people with specific qualifications or messaging people to whom one is not already connected, can only be accessed by the premium members. Premium membership comes at a monthly fee from €6.35 to €9.95 depending on the billing interval you choose and the country you are from. The platform uses https and has a rigid privacy and no-spam policy.

XING has a special Ambassador program for each city or region around the world with a substantial constituency. The Ambassadors hold local events that promote the use of social networking as a business tool, letting members introduce business ideas to one another.

XING also offers the system for closed communities, called Enterprise groups with their own access paths and interface designs. The platform serves as the infrastructure for corporate groups, including IBM, McKinsey, Accenture and others.

About 76% of all pageviews come from Germany, 90% from the D-A-CH area (Germany, Austria and Switzerland).

As of 15 September 2017 XING has changed its legal status to become a Societas Europaea.

If a user wishes to change their name, additional proof is demanded. In case of affirmation of gender for transgender people given names and gender will not be changed without medical testimony or provision of court documents confirming the person's transition in a medical or legal context. If gender is reassigned, birth names are removed, which is legally required, because any disclosure or investigation would be illegal under German law, as per Sec. 5 para. 1 and Sec. 10 para. 2 Transsexual Act.

Revenue

XING Mobile
Xing.com Mobile allows users to access some of its functions using a mobile phone, PDA or smartphone. Standards supported: HTML 3.2, XHTML MP 1.0, WML 1.1.

XING plug-ins
Xing.com plugins are available for free download that allow contact synchronization with Lotus Notes, Microsoft Outlook, Windows Address Book and Outlook Express. It also allows manual CSV File import–export and has a Firefox search plug-in.

Recruitment 
Since October 2007, XING has run a job marketplace for candidates and recruiters. Alongside fixed-price job ads, XING was one of the first German job boards to use a pay-per-click payment model, where the cost of an ad is based on user views

See also

 LinkedIn
 Viadeo
 BoardEx
 Professional network service
 Social software
 Social networking service
 List of social networking websites

References

External links

Companies based in Hamburg
Professional networks
German social networking websites
2003 establishments in Germany
Employment social networks
Companies in the TecDAX